The women's team foil was one of eight fencing events on the fencing at the 1960 Summer Olympics programme. It was the first appearance of the event. The competition was held on 3 September 1960. 57 fencers from 12 nations competed. The winner of the tournament was the Soviet Union, followed by Hungary and Italy in third.

Competition format 
The competition combined pool play with knockout rounds. The first round consisted of pools, with the 12 teams entered in the competition divided into 4 pools of 3 teams. The top 2 teams in each pool after a round-robin advanced. The 8 teams remaining after the pool play competed in a three-round single-elimination bracket, with a bronze medal match between the semifinal losers. 

Each team match consisted of each of the four fencers on one team facing each fencer on the other team, for a maximum of 16 total bouts. An 8–8 tie would be resolved by touches received. Bouts were to 4 touches. Only as much fencing was done as was necessary to determine pool placement (in the first round) or the winning team (in the knockout rounds), so not all matches went to the full 16 bouts but instead stopped early (typically when one team had 9 bouts won).

Rosters

Austria
 Helga Gnauer
 Traudl Ebert
 Waltraut Peck-Repa
 Maria Grötzer

France
 Monique Leroux
 Régine Veronnet
 Françoise Mailliard
 Renée Garilhe
 Catherine Delbarre

Germany
 Heidi Schmid
 Helga Mees
 Helga Stroh
 Helmi Höhle
 Gundi Theuerkauff
 Romy Weiß-Scherberger

Great Britain
 Gillian Sheen
 Jeannette Bailey
 Shirley Netherway
 Mary Glen-Haig

Hungary
 Ildikó Ságiné Ujlakyné Rejtő
 Györgyi Marvalics-Székely
 Magda Nyári-Kovács
 Katalin Nagyné Juhász
 Lídia Sákovicsné Dömölky

Italy
 Antonella Ragno-Lonzi
 Irene Camber-Corno
 Velleda Cesari
 Bruna Colombetti-Peroncini
 Claudia Pasini

Netherlands
 Nina Kleijweg
 Danny van Rossem
 Leni Kokkes-Hanepen
 Elly Botbijl

Poland
 Elżbieta Pawlas
 Sylwia Julito
 Barbara Orzechowska-Ryszel
 Genowefa Migas-Stawarz
 Wanda Fukała-Kaczmarczyk

Romania
 Ecaterina Orb-Lazăr
 Eugenia Mateianu
 Olga Orban-Szabo
 Maria Vicol

Soviet Union
 Valentina Rastvorova
 Galina Gorokhova
 Tatyana Petrenko-Samusenko
 Lyudmila Shishova
 Valentina Prudskova
 Aleksandra Zabelina

United States
 Judy Goodrich
 Jan York-Romary
 Maxine Mitchell
 Harriet King
 Evelyn Terhune

Venezuela
 Ingrid Sander
 Norma Santini
 Belkis Leal
 Teófila Márquiz

Results

Round 1

Pool A 

Italy defeated Venezuela, as did the Soviet Union. This eliminated Venezuela; Italy and the Soviet Union faced off to determine their placing within the group. The Soviet Union took first in the group with a win over Italy.

Pool B 

Romania defeated Great Britain, as did Hungary. This eliminated Great Britain; Romania and Hungary faced off to determine their placing within the group. Hungary took first in the group with a win over Romania.

Pool C 

The Netherlands defeated Austria, as did Germany. This eliminated Austria; the Netherlands and Germany faced off to determine their placing within the group. Germany took first in the group with a win over the Netherlands.

Pool D 

The United States and Poland fenced to a tie, 8 bouts to 8 and 47 touches received to 47. France defeated the United States. Poland defeated France.

Elimination rounds

Final classification

References

Foil team
Olymp
Fen